Billie Jean King successfully defended her title, defeating Ann Jones in the final, 6–3, 6–4 to win the ladies' singles tennis title at the 1967 Wimbledon Championships.

Seeds

  Billie Jean King (champion)
  Maria Bueno (fourth round)
  Ann Jones (final)
  Françoise Dürr (third round)
  Nancy Richey (fourth round)
  Lesley Turner (quarterfinals)
  Annette Van Zyl (fourth round)
  Virginia Wade (quarterfinals)

Draw

Finals

Top half

Section 1

Section 2

Section 3

Section 4

Bottom half

Section 5

Section 6

Section 7

Section 8

References

External links

Women's Singles
Wimbledon Championship by year – Women's singles
Wimbledon Championships
Wimbledon Championships